JamKazam is proprietary networked music performance software that enables real-time rehearsing, jamming and performing with musicians at remote locations, overcoming latency - the time lapse that occurs while (compressed) audio streams travel to and from each musician.

JamKazam is available in free and premium versions; the free version is peer-to-peer only, while the paid version offers the client-server model too, choosing whichever route is faster. It also allows streaming to social media, and has pre-recorded "JamTracks" for subscribers to play along to.

The founders ran out of capital in 2017, but like other software of this type, saw huge growth during the 2020 COVID-19 pandemic, and managed to raise over $100,000 through crowdfunding on GoFundMe.

See also 
 Jamstud.io
 Jamulus
 Ninjam / Ninbot
 SonoBus
 HPSJam
 Koord
 Comparison of Remote Music Performance Software

References

Audio software
2014 software
Music software